Vivien Lyra Blair (born June 4, 2012) is an American child actress who made her debut in the 2017 film Band Aid. In 2018, she rose to prominence for her role as Girl in the film Bird Box. Blair garnered further recognition for her appearances in video game Telling Lies (2019) and superhero film We Can Be Heroes (2020). In 2022, she received near-unanimous acclaim for her portrayal of Leia Organa in the streaming series Obi-Wan Kenobi. She was also nominated for a Saturn Award for Best Performance by a Younger Actor in a Streaming Television Series.

Early life
Vivien Lyra Blair was born in June 4, 2012. Blair has been vegetarian since she was born. She has practiced Taekwondo since the age of five. In 2019, at six years old, Blair became the youngest spokesperson for People for the Ethical Treatment of Animals.

Career 
Blair's first onscreen role was in the 2017 film Band Aid, and she subsequently appeared in the television miniseries Waco in 2018. She rose to prominence at the age of five after starring in the film Bird Box. Blair portrays Girl, who–along with her mother and brother—is blindfolded as protection from entities that cause people to die once they have been seen. Blair spent the majority of the film blindfolded. In 2019, she appeared in the video game Telling Lies, in which The Guardian considered her "[a]n unexpected joy ... with adorable confidence". Blair also starred as Guppy in the superhero film We Can Be Heroes (2020), the sequel to The Adventures of Sharkboy and Lavagirl in 3-D (2005). She undertook all her own stunts. While the film itself received mixed reviews, The Daily Telegraph praised Blair's performance as "very funny" and "just absurd ... the effects team simply aren't needed when she's doing her thing". 

In 2022, Blair portrayed Leia Organa in the Star Wars streaming show Obi-Wan Kenobi. Of Blair's casting, series writer Joby Harold stated the team needed an actor who would embody a young Carrie Fisher's voice and spirit: "[we need] [s]omebody who feels spirited. They don't feel precocious. They don't feel like they are speaking as an adult writing for a kid, but you feel the spirit of what Carrie Fisher built." Harold found Blair to be "an amazing little actor" who miraculously captured that spirit, particularly in her scenes with co-star Ewan McGregor. Her performance received near-unanimous acclaim, with praise for her portrayal of the character's strength, wit, and intelligence; NPR commented that "Blair practically channels Carrie Fisher's subversive, wisecracking spirit". In a more mixed review of her performance, Nick Schager of The Daily Beast thought Blair's line deliveries were "not ... consistently great" but considered her adequate for the role. Blair's performance was nominated for a Saturn Award for Best Performance by a Younger Actor in a Streaming Television Series. She played Emily Gradstone in the film drama Dear Zoe, which is based on the eponymous young-adult novel by Philip Beard. It was released on November 4, 2022, to mixed reviews. She is also set to appear in The Boogeyman (2023), an adaptation of Stephen King's eponymous short story.

Filmography

Film

Television

Video games

Awards and nominations

Notes

References

External links 
 

Living people
21st-century American actresses
American child actresses
American film actresses
American television actresses
American video game actresses
American voice actresses
2010s births